Glenn Walters may refer to:
 Glenn D. Walters, American forensic psychologist
 Glenn M. Walters (born 1957), United States Marine Corps general